, stylized as Kirakira☆PreCure a la Mode is a 2017 Japanese magical girl anime series produced by Toei Animation and the fourteenth installment in Izumi Todo's Pretty Cure metaseries, featuring the twelfth generation of Cures. It is directed by Kohei Kureta and Yukio Kaizawa. Jin Tanaka wrote the script, and Marie Ino designed the characters. The cake and sweets designs were handled by pâtissière Junko Fukuda. The series began airing on all All-Nippon News Network stations in Japan on February 5, 2017, succeeding Witchy PreCure! in its initial timeslot.  It was then succeeded by Hug! Pretty Cure on February 4, 2018. The series' main topic is happiness, while desserts, animals, and creativity serve as the motif.

Toei Animation Inc. licensed the series outside Japan for all territories, with Crunchyroll streaming the series starting on August 20, 2020. It is the third series (excluding Smile PreCure! and DokiDoki! PreCure) to be released under the "Pretty Cure" name since Futari wa Pretty Cure.

Plot

Ichika Usami is a second year middle school student who loves sweets and wishes to work in a patisserie, but struggles to make anything good. One day, she encounters a fairy named Pekorin, who is able to detect "kirakiral", an element residing in sweets that represent the feelings put into them. However, evil fairies start to steal the kirakiral for themselves, leaving the sweets black and lifeless. Determined to protect the sweets, Ichika gains the power of the Legendary Patisserie and transforms into the Pretty Cure, Cure Whip, to protect the kirakiral. Joined by five other Pretty Cures, Ichika opens up the mobile sweet shop, Kirakira Patisserie, and spends her days making sweets while fighting against those who seek to steal kirakiral and bring misfortune to the world.

Production
The series was first registered by Toei at the Japanese Copyright Office on October 25, 2016. A month after registration, Toei opened a teaser site for the series with the catchphrase "Create, Taste and Battle!". On December 26, 2016, Toei updated the official website with main characters and staff, alongside the two theme songs and the official release date, also marking as the third series in the franchise to utilize a 5-piece group. It was also confirmed that the main characters were all running a sweets shop and although it will still feature battle scenes like its predecessor, Kira Kira will have a different style of fight scenes called Colorful Pop Battles in order to fit with the series's theme.

In an interview with the team behind the series, they expressed a lot of concepts being used and adapted in the series. The producers stated that the 5-piece team concept was used after 10 years in order to differentiate it from the previous series, Maho Girls PreCure! which uses the "Buddy Concept". The motif of the series was decided also by the producers due to the choices are being taken. Producer Yu Kaminoki said that "Running a Sweets Shop/bakery is one of many girls have dreamed of when they grow up, and that is a good theme for the next series. However deciding how fighting elements would fit in a Dessert-themed series is hard and is not compatible with Pretty Cure or any fighting girls series" and also stated "using Animals as a secondary morif could help balance the first motif of the series and is possible with imagination, to actually make the series work than just using Sweets as the series's motif". Also, the producer said that "Animal mofif would extend to the main character, Ichika, who decorates and creates desserts with an animal motif due to her huge imagination."

While discussing the staff, the producer said that Kohei Kureta and Yukio Kaizawa were chosen to direct the series, as a way to lessen the burden in production due to coming up with newer concepts. Yukio Kaizawa was also chosen due to his work with Cure Flora and the Mischievous Mirror short film and that he said that he wanted to incorporate new ideas into the series as director. Kaizawa also stated that it was his first time to direct a series in Toei's Sunday morning lineup since joining the staff and that directing alongside Kohei Kureta would be a challenge. Kureta was grateful that he can work with him. Despite working together, both directors will direct the series in different episodes and both will have responsibility for how the series will turn out.

For the characters, the staff made each of their personalities unique in order to match the animal motif of the series. The most unique one to stand out is Akira, in which the producers based her overall role to the  actresses of Takarazuka Revue, a theatrical group owned by Hankyu Corporation. Nanako Mori said that her experience with the group in the past is the inspiration for her role in the anime and that playing a big sister in the series is a first.

Media

Anime

The anime began airing on All-Nippon News Network stations in Japan, including ABC and TV Asahi, on February 5, 2017, replacing the previous series, Maho Girls PreCure!, in its initial timeslot. For the other 27 episodes, a second ending theme is used called  by Miyamoto. The music of the series is composed by Yuki Hayashi (My Hero Academia, Haikyū!!, Gundam Build Fighters). The first single of the series was released on March 1, 2017 along with the first official soundtrack on May 31, 2017 titled Precure Sound Decoration!!. A second official soundtrack for the series was released on November 29, 2017 with the title Precure Sound Go Round!!. A vocal best album titled Suite☆Etude☆A La Mode was released on January 24, 2018, which featured songs from the anime and its movie. Toei Animation Inc. licensed the series outside Japan with Crunchyroll streaming the series in Europe, the Middle East and Africa from August 20, 2020, and in North America, Latin America, South Africa, Australia and New Zealand from August 24, 2020.

Films
The characters of the series appeared alongside characters from Go! Princess PreCure and Maho Girls PreCure! in the crossover film, Pretty Cure Dream Stars!, which was released in Japan on March 18, 2017. A film based on the series, titled , including a fully CG animated short titled  was released on October 28, 2017.

Manga
The manga adaptation of the anime was serialized in the March 2017 issue of Kodansha's Nakayoshi magazine, written and illustrated by Futago Kamikita and ended serialization on December 29, 2017. The first tankōbon was released on August 10, 2017, with the second released on March 13, 2018.

Promotion
To promote the anime series, they launched the campaign for the Kirakira Pretty Cure a la Mode themed hotel rooms at Shirakaba Resort's Ike no Taira Hotel in Lake Shirakaba, Nagano Prefecture. In their "7 Great Gay and Lesbian Relationships In Anime" opinion feature, Crunchyroll included the relation between Cure Macaron and Cure Chocolat, and compared it to the romantic relationship of Sailor Neptune and Sailor Uranus. However, the voice actress for Cure Macaron had said in an interview that, since it is a show aimed at little girls, she had been told by the staff that the feelings of the characters were not "love". Nonetheless, she expressed that there is room for different interpretations of relationships and love.

Notes

References

External links
  at Toei Animation 
  at TV Asahi 
 
 
  

2017 anime television series debuts
2018 Japanese television series endings
2017 comics endings
Cooking in anime and manga
Crunchyroll anime
Magical girl anime and manga
Pretty Cure
Toei Animation television
TV Asahi original programming
Animated television series about animals